Döring is a surname:

 Alfred Döring, German middle-distance runner
 André Döring, Former Brazilian goalkeeper
 Christian Döring, German bible publisher
 Christian Döring, East German slalom canoeist
 Danny Doring, American wrestler
 Federico Döring, Mexican conservative politician 
 Hans Döring, German painter
 Hans Döring, German SS officer and politician
 Heinrich Döring, German writer, theologian and mineralogist
 Julius Döring, German artist, drawing teacher and historian
 Klaus Döring, German classical philologist and philosophical historian
 Manfred Döring, Major general with the East German Stasi
 Matthias Döring, German Franciscan historian and theologian
 Peter Döring, German wrestler
 Werner Döring, German theoretical physicist
 Margret Hofheinz-Döring, German painter and graphic artist
 Kurt-Bertram von Döring, German World War II Luftwaffe Generalleutnant

Ethnonymic surnames